Major Thomas Forsyth (December 5, 1771 – October 29, 1833) was a 19th-century American frontiersman and trader who served as a U.S. Indian agent to the Sauk and Fox during the 1820s and was replaced by Felix St. Vrain, prior to the Black Hawk War. His writings, both prior to and while an Indian agent, provided an invaluable source of the early Native American history in the Northwest Territory. His son, Robert Forsyth, was a colonel in the United States Army and an early settler of Chicago, Illinois.

Early life and family
Thomas Forsyth was born in Detroit to William Forsyth, a Scots-Irish Presbyterian who immigrated from Ireland around 1750. A veteran of the French and Indian War, his father was twice wounded, while fighting under General Wolfe at the capture of Quebec in 1759. The elder Forsyth had married the widow of another trader, so he was raised alongside his half-brother John Kinzie, with whom he would also later work. Shortly after Thomas Forsyth was born, his father was imprisoned as a loyalist during the American Revolutionary War. Thomas Forsyth became a successful Indian trader in his youth, spending several years living with the Ottawas on Saginaw Bay. As early as 1798, he spent the winter on an island in the Mississippi a short distance downstream from present-day Quincy, Illinois.

Indian trader, spy, and United States Indian agent
Thomas Forsyth later became partners with his half-brother, John Kinzie, and his son, Robert Forsyth. The two established a trading post in 1802 at the site of what is present-day Chicago, Illinois. After marrying a Keziah Malotte near Malden in 1804, Forsyth moved to Peoria Lake, where he became a successful trader and businessman. During the Peoria War, he served as a spy for Governor William Clark and was later an agent for the tribes in the region and was able to persuade the Illinois River Pottawatomie to remain neutral during the War of 1812. In December of that year, he and a number of others at the agency were arrested by the Illinois Rangers under Captain Thomas E. Craig, who later ordered Peoria to be burned. Forsyth was bitterly resentful of Craig's actions, but Craig defended himself by claiming neither he nor anyone else outside of Washington, D.C. knew of his status as an Indian agent. "It was supposed by the President that Mr. Forsyth would be more serviceable, to both sides, if his friends, the Indians, did not know this situation."

Thomas Forsyth and the others were eventually released by Craig, who dropped them off on the riverbank below Alton, Illinois, where they were "in a starving condition (and) they were landed in the woods ... without shelter or food." He would later distinguish himself as an outspoken supporter of peace for both Native Americans and the U.S. government and, often risking his own life, negotiated with tribal leaders for the release of American prisoners. This was most evident in his securing the release of the survivors of the Fort Dearborn massacre, among whom included Lieutenant Lenai T. Helm, the son-in-law of John Kinzie.

Officially appointed a U.S. Indian subagent for the Sauk and Fox at Rock Island, Illinois, he was later stationed at Fort Armstrong and reported the movements of the Sauk and Fox as well as its ever-increasing strength in the region during the early 1820s. He became a respected figure in the region, however he was eventually replaced after 18 years of service by Felix St. Vrain due to Forsyth's insubordinate attitude, unwillingness to remain at the fort, and the criticism of his supervisor. His successor, 31-year-old Kaskaskia sawmill operator Felix St. Vrain, proved to be unpopular and his inexperience eventually resulted in the St. Vrain massacre. It has been speculated by historians such as Lyman Copeland Draper that his removal from the position as Indian agent to the Sauk and Fox could have prevented the Black Hawk War.

Death
Forsyth retired to St. Louis, Missouri where he died on October 29, 1833. He was survived by his wife, who died only four years later, and his four children.

References

Further reading
Forsyth, Thomas and Lyman Copeland Draper, ed. "Journal of a Voyage from St. Louis to the Falls of St. Anthony, in 1819". Wisconsin State Historical Society Collections. Vol. VI. Madison: Wisconsin State Historical Society, 1872.
Transcripts of the Illinois State Historical Society. Pub. 9 (1904). Springfield, Illinois: Philips Brothers, 1904. (pg. 138-142)

External links

1771 births
1833 deaths
American people of the Indian Wars
American people of the War of 1812
American people of the Black Hawk War
People from Detroit
People from St. Louis
American people of Scotch-Irish descent
American Presbyterians
United States Indian agents
People from Illinois